Medicx Fund was an Irish property investment company listed on the FTSE SmallCap Index specialising in primary healthcare infrastructure backed by long-term Government contracts. 

The company was registered in Guernsey and incorporated in 2006. In 2019, the firm was taken over by Primary Health Properties in 2019.

History 
Medicx Fund was owned and managed by Octopus Healthcare. Its Irish portfolio, consisting of four primary care schemes currently up and running, with a fifth one in Rialto, Dublin due to be completed in early 2019, was valued at more than €60 million. The company bought a new primary healthcare centre in Tallaght for €15.5 million in 2017.

Medicx Fund purchased One Medical Group in June 2018 for £63.8 million. At the time, it owned 166 properties, 3 of which were still under construction, with a total value of valued at £719.7 million. Annual rent income is £43.9 million.

It was taken over by Primary Health Properties in 2019.

References

Investment companies of the United Kingdom